Charles S. and Mary McGill House is a historic home located at Valparaiso, Porter County, Indiana.  It was built in 1926, and is a two-story, "Z"-shaped Tudor Revival style brick dwelling.  It has a steeply pitched cross-hipped roof and features stuccoed areas with half-timbering and massive chimneys.

It was listed on the National Register of Historic Places in 2013.

References

Houses on the National Register of Historic Places in Indiana
Tudor Revival architecture in Indiana
Houses completed in 1926
Houses in Porter County, Indiana
National Register of Historic Places in Porter County, Indiana